Rube Schauer (born Alexander John Schauer) (March 19, 1891 – April 15, 1957), was a Major League Baseball player who played pitcher from –. Schauer played for the New York Giants and Philadelphia Athletics.

References

External links

1891 births
1957 deaths
Major League Baseball pitchers
Major League Baseball players from Russia
New York Giants (NL) players
Philadelphia Athletics players
Superior Red Sox players
Louisville Colonels (minor league) players
Minneapolis Millers (baseball) players
St. Joseph Saints players
Russian baseball players